The Black Pine Mountains are a mountain range in the U.S. states of Idaho (~65%) and Utah (~35%), spanning Cassia County, Idaho and reaching into Box Elder County, Utah. In Idaho, the mountains are part of the Black Pine Division of the Minidoka Ranger District of Sawtooth National Forest.

The Raft River Mountains are southwest of the range, while the Albion Mountains are to the west, and the Sublett Mountains are to the northeast. The northern slopes of the mountains are in the Snake River watershed, which is a tributary of the Columbia River, while the southern slopes drain to the Great Salt Lake. The town of Snowville, Utah is southeast of the mountains, and Malta, Idaho is to the northwest. Interstate 84 passes just to the east of the mountains.

Peaks

References

External links 

 U.S. Forest Service Sawtooth National Forest

Mountain ranges of Box Elder County, Utah
Landforms of Cassia County, Idaho
Mountain ranges of Idaho
Sawtooth National Forest
Mountain ranges of Utah